Aydıncık Nature Park is a nature park in Turkey. Gilindire Cave is to the east of the nature park. It was declared a picnic area in 1988 and a nature park in 2011.

The park is at the east side of Aydıncık bay, facing Aydıncık Islands and the town. 
The natural flora consists of Turkish pine (Pinus brutia), myrtle (myrtus communis), kermes oak (quercus coccifera) and laurel (laurus nobilis), and spini broom (calicotome villosa). Mediterranean gull (chthyaetus melanocephalus), Mediterranean monk seal (monachus monachus ) and various small reptiles make up the fauna around the park.

References

Nature parks in Turkey
Beaches of Turkey
2011 establishments in Turkey
Aydıncık District (Mersin)
Parks in Mersin Province
Protected areas established in 2011